Olowo Elewuokun was a traditional ruler of Owo Kingdom, Ondo state, southwestern Nigeria. He succeeded his brother, Olowo Ajaka and was succeeded by his son, Olowo Aragunwaye.

References

Yoruba monarchs
Nigerian traditional rulers
People from Owo
Olagbegi family